Liberty Township is the name of eighteen townships in the U.S. state of Indiana:

 Liberty Township, Carroll County, Indiana
 Liberty Township, Crawford County, Indiana
 Liberty Township, Delaware County, Indiana
 Liberty Township, Fulton County, Indiana
 Liberty Township, Grant County, Indiana
 Liberty Township, Hendricks County, Indiana
 Liberty Township, Henry County, Indiana
 Liberty Township, Howard County, Indiana
 Liberty Township, Parke County, Indiana
 Liberty Township, Porter County, Indiana
 Liberty Township, St. Joseph County, Indiana
 Liberty Township, Shelby County, Indiana
 Liberty Township, Tipton County, Indiana
 Liberty Township, Union County, Indiana
 Liberty Township, Wabash County, Indiana
 Liberty Township, Warren County, Indiana
 Liberty Township, Wells County, Indiana
 Liberty Township, White County, Indiana

Indiana township disambiguation pages